The Puyallup, Spuyalpabš  or S’Puyalupubsh (pronounced: Spoy-all-up-obsh) ('generous and welcoming behavior to all people, who enter our lands') are a federally recognized Coast Salish Native American tribe from western Washington state, United States. They were relocated onto reservation lands in what is today Tacoma, Washington, in late 1854, after signing the Treaty of Medicine Creek with the United States. Today they have an enrolled population of 6,700, of whom 3,000 live on the reservation.

The Puyallup Indian Reservation is one of the most urban Indian reservations in the United States with a population of 2,500. It is located primarily in northern Pierce County, with a very small part extending north into the city of Federal Way, in King County. Parts of seven communities in the Tacoma metropolitan area extend onto reservation land; in addition the tribe controls off-reservation trust land.

In decreasing order of included population, the communities are Tacoma, Waller, Fife, Milton, Edgewood, Puyallup, and Federal Way. The reservation has a land area of 73.935 km² (28.547 sq mi), and a 2000 census resident population of 41,341 persons. These are predominantly non-Native Americans. The tribe has 6,700 enrolled members, of whom 2,500 live on the reservation.

According to the census, more than 72 percent of the residents within the reservation boundaries identified as only Caucasian (European-American), and 3.2 percent identify as solely of Native American ancestry. The Puyallup, as with other Native American tribes, have long assimilated other ethnicities through intermarriage and adoption. They have brought up ethnically mixed children to identify with the tribe, both culturally and ethnically.

History
The Puyallup tribe originally spoke the Txʷǝlšucid or Twulshootseed local dialect of the Southern Lushootseed language of the Salishan family of languages, predominant among Northwest Coast indigenous peoples. They share a culture similar to that of other Northwest tribes, with a diet that depended on fishing salmon and other regional fish.

Reservation

With a land area of 73.935 km² (28.547 sq mi), the reservation is one of the largest in the Northwest. Its size notwithstanding, it is often not shown on Washington maps because its land has been so thoroughly sold off to non-Natives.

Due to land sales at a time when land was distributed to householders and other developments, neighboring jurisdictions have territory within the reservation. The city of Fife, Washington and the unincorporated community of Fife Heights, Washington lies entirely within the reservation as does much of the Port of Tacoma. The total population within the reservation is predominantly non-Native and not tribal members, according to the 2000 census.

From the mid-nineteenth century, European Americans began to enter the area in greater numbers. The United States wanted to enable development of lands and settlement by these people. They arranged with the Puyallup and several other tribes, under the Treaty of Medicine Creek (1854), for the tribes to cede land to the US and go to the more restricted area of a reservation. This was initially designated for residence only by tribal members. The Puyallup and United States representatives had such different conceptions of property that they did not fully understand each other's position . While the tribe lost most of its historic territory, it retained rights for fishing, hunting and gathering on that land.

The Port of Tacoma and the Puyallup Tribe reached a $163 million settlement in 1989–1990, enabled by the Puyallup Tribe of Indians Settlement Act of 1989. It became one of the largest 20th century Indian land claims settlements.

Government

In 1936 the Tribal Government was formed under the Wheeler Howard Act (also known as the Indian Reorganization Act), authorizing Native American tribes to re-establish their governments. The tribe wrote a constitution creating an elected government of representation at the Tribal Council, supported by a Tribal Court for certain level of issues among its tribal members.

Tribal Council
The tribal council is an elected body of seven people who oversee the operation of all the tribal programs. The Tribal Council is vested with power to govern by the Constitution. The Council acts as both the legislative and administrative bodies of the government. Members are elected by the general membership for three-year terms. Council members select a chair and vice chair. 

Herman Dillon Sr. (more known as  the Chief.)

Late Council Chairman Dillon. served on the council consecutively for more than two decades, up until his death. In this position he often represented the Tribe at meetings of various government entities, from the Tacoma area to the federal government in Washington, D.C.

On June 7, 2019, the Puyallup Tribal Council chose David Z. Bean as chairman and Bill Sterud as vice chairman.

The tribe operates numerous programs that are open to the public beyond intertribally enrolled members. Among its programs, the tribe operates https://en.wikipedia.org/wiki/Chief_Leschi_Schools K-12, 
a School for Native American children exclusively now.

For more History on the tribe visit their website http://puyallup-tribe.com/.

Tribal Court
The Tribal Court and Children's Court (hereinafter “Court”) were established by the Puyallup Tribe's Constitution. The court's mission is to apply the written laws of its legislature, while recognizing the inherent customs and traditions of its people. The Court is devoted to protecting people's due process rights. The tribe explicitly works to protect children and elders, “who are considered sacred”. The Court's Chief Justice is Darwin Long Fox.

Economic development
Initially the federal government wanted Native Americans to develop the family farms then typical of European Americans. This was not a concept that the Puyallup were comfortable adopting. They remained deeply involved in fishing, which constituted such an important part of their culture that it is surrounded by ritual and spirituality.

With economic and social changes in the 20th and 21st centuries, the tribe needed to develop other sources of employment and income than farming for its people. In the 20th century, the tribe generated income through cigarette sales. They could sell them at a lower price and tax-free to non-Natives, as their reservation is sovereign territory and they need not pay state taxes from their businesses. In recent years, the tribe signed an agreement with the State of Washington to sell cigarettes with taxes paid. The tribe and the state have a sharing of tax revenue collected from sales of cigarettes.

Casino history
Since the late 20th century, numerous states have used gambling, based on lotteries and other methods, as a source of revenue to support programs wanted by taxpayers. Changes in federal law and negotiations with such states have enabled federally recognized tribes on many reservations to establish bingo and other gambling facilities to generate revenue.

Searching for new revenues and employment for its people, the Puyallup opened the Emerald Queen Casino in 1996 on a paddlewheel riverboat, the Emerald Queen, which it berthed in the Port of Tacoma. The riverboat was acquired for $15 million and could accommodate 2,000 people. In 2004, as part of an agreement with the Port to accommodate further commercial development of the waterway, the tribe closed the operation on the boat and its shore-side property. The unused Emerald Queen riverboat remained docked in Tacoma until 2023, when it was sold to a barge operator based in Seattle.

The tribe has developed related gaming and entertainment facilities in two other locations, keeping the name Emerald Queen Casino for its overall operation. In the 21st century, a majority of the tribe's income is generated from the gambling casinos and related restaurant, retail and hotel facilities.

In total area, the casino is one of the largest in Washington state. It has locations in both Tacoma and Fife. The Tacoma location, includes the casino, a restaurant and buffet and an entertainment venue hosting singers and comedians. The entertainment venue, in collaboration with Brian Halquist Productions, Inc., is host to the Battle at the Boat boxing series, which is the longest-running casino boxing series in the Pacific Northwest. A majority of the casino is located in a new 310,000 sq ft multi-level structure, which opened in June 2020; also includes a hotel and parking garage. The original I-5 location was intended as a temporary facility, and closed permanently in May 2020. It has continued to be used pending other development. The permanent structure of the old casino is located in the old Puyallup Bingo Hall. The I-5 location opened originally in 2001, and the tent addition was opened in 2004.

The Fife location includes a casino and a 140-room hotel. The tribe adapted a Best Western hotel for these purposes after purchasing the building in 2004. After renovation, the casino was opened in early 2005. The tribe undertook a major expansion in summer 2007, building two parking garages, a pool, a spa, new administrative towers, a ballroom, and a larger gaming area. The casino's restaurant, formerly named the Pacific Rim, was moved to the south tower and renamed the Tatoosh Grill.  What is now the Pacific Rim Buffet is located on the ground floor of the tower.

A new building for the Tacoma location was opened on June 8, 2020, following a $400 million expansion project. The  facility near I-5 has five restaurants and a 12-story, 170-room hotel. The project also includes an events center with capacity for 2,000 people.

Other ventures
The Puyallup Tribe has used its economic development branch, Marine View Ventures, to expand into operating several gas stations on the reservation. In the early 21st century, it was using gambling revenues to invest in a partnership for a large container facility at the Port of Tacoma. When completed, it will be the largest such facility in the Northwest and will connect the tribe to the shipping trade.

The Puyallup Tribe has also invested in the state's legal cannabis market. The tribe's first recreational cannabis store, Commencement Bay Cannabis, is located in Fife, adjacent to the casino itself.

References

Puyallup Reservation and Off-Reservation Trust Land, Washington United States Census Bureau
Communities on the Puyallup Reservation, United States Census Bureau

External links
 Puyallup Tribe of Indians, official website
 Emerald Queen Casino Website
 

Lushootseed language
Native American tribes in Washington (state)
Puyallup